Dr. Farid Kamal Ramzi Stino is an Egyptian scientist, scholar, and entrepreneur who was born in Cairo, Egypt on September 1, 1943. He is the son of Dr. Kamal Ramzi Stino, the late Deputy Prime Minister of Egypt under Nasser's regime, and Lady Farida Shawky Shenouda, the daughter of Shawkey BEK Shenouda of Egypt. He earned his Bachelor of Science degree from Cairo University, Egypt,in 1964. He then travelled to the United States and earned his Master of Science degree in 1968 and his Ph.D. degree in 1971, from The University of Georgia, in Athens, Georgia, USA. It was there that he met and married his wife of 33 years, Dr. Zandra Hargrove Stino. He has five living children: Ramzi, Farida, Karim, Magdi and Farrah. He is the beloved grandfather of Jadon Stino Gibson, Martino Ramzi Stino, Natalia Stino Gibson, Mario Ramzi Stino, and Austen Karim Stino.

Dr. Stino was the President and CEO of Ismailia-Misr Poultry Company, one of the largest poultry companies in the Middle East.
He is also the owner and founder of Stino Farms, based in Cairo.  
He founded Stino Agriconsults, an Agricultural Consulting Firm that had more than 25 consultants, including Dr. Nageeb Goher, the former President of Cairo University and Dr. Gamal Kamar the former Professor of Poultry Physiology and Dr. Hamdy Mourad, the late Animal Physiologist. Dr. Stino taught Poultry Breeding and Genetics at Cairo University. He also taught Biostatistics and Computer Methodology, as a visiting professor, at Florida Agriculture and Mechanical University (FAMU) in Tallahassee Florida, USA for twelve years starting 1988. He returned to Cairo University in 2000 to head the Department of Animal Production, Faculty of Agriculture, Cairo University. Twelve Ph.D. students and twenty six M.S. students graduated under his supervision. He has more than 65 published articles in peer-review journals. 
His passion for genetics and poultry led him to engineer and create the worlds only white meat quail, which is at least double the size of wild quail. Stino quail is coveted all over the region and is sold at five star restaurants, hotels and markets. He spends his retirement years still teaching Biostatistics at Cairo University.

References

External links
Stino Farms official website
"Swine and the Flu," editorial by Dr. Stino

Year of birth missing (living people)
Egyptian Copts
Living people
Place of birth missing (living people)

nl:Kamal Stino#Familie